Populous or populus may refer to:
Populous (series), video game series
Populous (video game), first video game of the series
Populous (company), an architectural firm
Populus, a genus of plants
Populus Ltd, a market research company

See also
Poplar (disambiguation)
Popular (disambiguation)